Neocollyris pacholatkoi is a species of ground beetle in the genus Neocollyris in the family Carabidae. It was described by Sawada and Wiesner in 2006 and is endemic to India.

Parent taxa
Subfamily : Cicindelinae (Latreille, 1802)
Tribe : Collyridini (Brullé, 1834)
Subtribe : Collyridina (Brullé, 1834)
Genus : Neocollyris (Horn, 1901)
Subgenus : Leptocollyris (Naviaux, 1994)

References

Pacholatkoi, Neocollyris
Beetles described in 2006
Endemic fauna of India